The Battle of Abensberg was fought on 20 April 1809, between an Allied force under the command of Emperor Napoleon I of France on one side and three Austrian corps led by Johann von Hiller, Archduke Louis of Austria, and Michael von Kienmayer. The Austrians formed the left wing of Archduke Charles, Duke of Teschen's main army and were under the overall command of Hiller. Napoleon's French troops, reinforced by troops from the Kingdom of Bavaria and the Kingdom of Württemberg outfought their opponents, inflicted heavy losses, and forced the Austrians to retreat to the southeast.

During the fighting, 55,000 French and Germans faced 42,000 Austrians. Of these, only about 25,000 on each side became involved in the fighting. The Austrians lost 2,710 killed and wounded, plus about 4,000 captured. Allied losses were 215 Frenchmen, 146 Württembergers, and 746 Bavarians, for a total of 1,107.

Austrian forces
Left Wing: Feldmarschall-Leutnant Johann von Hiller

VI Armeekorps

Feldmarschall-Leutnant Johann von Hiller (35,639)
 Reserve Artillery: Feldmarschall-Leutnant Karl von Rouvroy
 Three 12-pdr position batteries (18 guns), 6-pdr position battery (6 guns)
 Division: Feldmarschall-Leutnant Friedrich Kottulinsky
 Brigade: General-Major Otto Hohenfeld
 Klebek Infantry Regiment # 14 (3 battalions)
 Jordis Infantry Regiment # 59 (3 battalions)
 6-pdr brigade battery (8 guns)
 Brigade: General-Major Nikolaus Weissenwolf
 Deutschmeister Infantry Regiment # 4 (3 battalions)
 Kerpen Infantry Regiment # 49 (3 battalions)
 6-pdr brigade battery (8 guns)
 Artillery: 6-pdr position battery (6 guns)
 Division: Feldmarschall-Leutnant Franz Jellacic (Jellacic detached at Munich)
 Brigade: General-Major Josef Hoffmeister (Brigade attached to Vincent)
 Benjowsky Infantry Regiment # 31 (3 battalions)
 Splenyi Infantry Regiment # 51 (3 battalions)
 6-pdr brigade battery (8 guns)
 Brigade: General-Major Konstantin Ettingshausen (Brigade detached at Munich)
 Esterhazy Infantry Regiment # 32 (3 battalions)
 De Vaux Infantry Regiment # 45 (3 battalions)
 6-pdr brigade battery (8 guns)
 Artillery: 6-pdr position battery (6 guns)
 Light Division: Feldmarschall-Leutnant Karl von Vincent
 Brigade: General-Major Karl Dollmayer von Provenchères (Brigade detached at Munich)
 Warasdin-Kreutzer Grenz Infantry Regiment # 5 (2 battalions)
 4th, 5th, 6th Vienna Freiwilligers battalions
 O'Reilly Chevauxleger Regiment # 3 (8 squadrons)
 3-pdr Grenz brigade battery (8 guns)
 6-pdr cavalry battery (6 guns)
 Brigade: General-Major Armand von Nordmann (Brigade detached at Moosburg)
 Warasdin-St. George Grenz Infantry Regiment # 6 (2 battalions)
 Rosenberg Chevauxleger Regiment # 6 (8 squadrons)
 Liechtenstein Hussar Regiment # 7 (8 squadrons)
 3-pdr Grenz brigade battery (8 guns)
 6-pdr cavalry battery (6 guns)

V Armeekorps

Feldmarschall-Leutnant Archduke Louis (32,266)
 Reserve Artillery: Major Adam Pfefferkorn
 Two 12-pdr position batteries (12 guns), one 6-pdr cavalry battery (6 guns)
 Brigade: General-Major Ludwig Thierry (Brigade attached from III Armeekorps)
 Kaiser Infantry Regiment # 1 (3 battalions)
 Lindenau Infantry Regiment # 29 (3 battalions)
 6-pdr brigade battery (8 guns)
 Division: Feldmarschall-Leutnant Karl Friedrich von Lindenau (Division detached to I Reserve Armeekorps)
 Brigade: General-Major Josef Mayer
 Archduke Charles Infantry Regiment # 3 (3 battalions)
 Stain Infantry Regiment # 50 (3 battalions)
 6-pdr brigade battery (8 guns)
 Brigade: General-Major Ignaz Buol von Berenburg
 Hiller Infantry Regiment # 2 (3 battalions)
 Sztarrai Infantry Regiment # 33 (3 battalions)
 Artillery: 6-pdr position battery (6 guns)
 Division: Feldmarschall-Leutnant Prince Heinrich XV of Reuss-Plauen
 Brigade: General-Major Frederick Bianchi, Duke of Casalanza
 Duka Infantry Regiment # 39 (3 battalions)
 Gyulai Infantry Regiment # 60 (3 battalions)
 6-pdr brigade battery (8 guns)
 Brigade: General-Major Franz Johann Schulz von Rothacker
 Beaulieu Infantry Regiment # 58 (3 battalions)
 1st, 2nd, 3rd Vienna Freiwilligers battalions
 Artillery: 6-pdr position battery (6 guns)
 Light Division: Feldmarschall-Leutnant Emmanuel von Schustekh-Herve
 Brigade: General-Major Joseph, Baron von Mesko de Felsö-Kubiny
 Broder Grenz Infantry Regiment # 7 (2 battalions)
 Kienmayer Hussar Regiment # 8 (8 squadrons)
 3-pdr Grenz brigade battery (8 guns)
 Brigade: General-Major Joseph Radetzky von Radetz
 Gradiscaner Grenz Infantry Regiment # 8 (2 battalions)
 Archduke Charles Uhlan Regiment # 3 (8 squadrons)
 Artillery: 6-pdr cavalry battery (6 guns)

II Reserve Armeekorps

Feldmarschall-Leutnant Michael von Kienmayer (7,975)
 Brigade: General-Major Konstantin Ghilian Karl d'Aspré
 Puteani Grenadier battalion
 Brezeczinsky Grenadier battalion
 Scovaud Grenadier battalion
 Kirchenbetter Grenadier battalion
 Scharlach Grenadier battalion
 6-pdr brigade battery (8 guns)
 Brigade: General-Major Andreas von Schneller (Brigade detached to I Reserve Armeekorps)
 Kaiser Cuirassier Regiment # 1 (6 squadrons)
 Gottesheim Cuirassier Regiment # 6 (6 squadrons)
 6-pdr cavalry battery (6 guns)
 Brigade: General-Major Josef von Clary (4 squadrons attached to Thierry)
 Levenehr Dragoon Regiment # 4 (6 squadrons)
 Württemberg Dragoon Regiment # 3 (6 squadrons)
 6-pdr cavalry battery (6 guns)

Generals

French-Allied forces
Grande Armée: Napoleon I of France

Provisional Corps

Marshal Jean Lannes
 Cavalry Brigade: General of Brigade Charles Claude Jacquinot (Attached from Montbrun)
 1st Chasseurs à cheval Regiment (3 squadrons)
 2nd Chasseurs à cheval Regiment (3 squadrons)
 12th Chasseurs à cheval Regiment (3 squadrons)
 1st Division: General of Division Charles Antoine Morand (11,065) (Attached from III Corps)
 Brigade: General of Brigade Nicolas Guiot de Lacour
 13th Light Infantry Regiment (3 battalions)
 17th Line Infantry Regiment (3 battalions)
 30th Line Infantry Regiment (3 battalions)
 Brigade: General of Brigade François l'Huillier de Hoff
 61st Line Infantry Regiment (3 battalions)
 65th Line Infantry Regiment (3 battalions) (Regiment detached at Regensburg)
 Divisional Artillery: 8-pdr foot battery (8 guns), 4-pdr horse battery (4 guns)
 3rd Division: General of Division Charles-Étienne Gudin de La Sablonnière (11,440) (Attached from III Corps)
 Brigade: General of Brigade Claude Petit
 7th Light Infantry Regiment (3 battalions)
 Brigade: General of Brigade Pierre Boyer
 12th Line Infantry Regiment (3 battalions)
 21st Line Infantry Regiment (3 battalions)
 Brigade: General of Brigade Jean Duppelin
 25th Line Infantry Regiment (3 battalions)
 85th Line Infantry Regiment (3 battalions)
 Divisional Artillery: 8-pdr foot battery (6 guns), 4-pdr horse battery (6 guns)
 1st Heavy Cavalry Division: General of Division Étienne Marie Antoine Champion de Nansouty (5,337) (Attached from Reserve)
 Brigade: General of Brigade Jean-Marie Defrance
 1st Carabinier Regiment (4 squadrons)
 2nd Carabinier Regiment (4 squadrons)
 Brigade: General of Brigade Jean-Pierre Doumerc
 2nd Cuirassier Regiment (4 squadrons)
 9th Cuirassier Regiment (4 squadrons)
 Brigade: General of Brigade Antoine Louis Decrest de Saint-Germain
 3rd Cuirassier Regiment (4 squadrons)
 12th Cuirassier Regiment (4 squadrons)
 Divisional Artillery: Two 8-pdr horse batteries (12 guns)
 2nd Heavy Cavalry Division: General of Division Raymond-Gaspard de Bonardi de Saint-Sulpice (3,411) (Attached from III Corps, one brigade guarding Saal)
 Brigade: General of Brigade François Marie Clément de la Roncière
 1st Cuirassier Regiment (4 squadrons)
 5th Cuirassier Regiment (4 squadrons)
 Brigade: General of Brigade Marie Adrien François Guiton
 10th Cuirassier Regiment (4 squadrons)
 11th Cuirassier Regiment (4 squadrons)
 Divisional Artillery: 8-pdr horse battery (6 guns)

VII (Bavarian) Corps

Marshal François Joseph Lefebvre
 Artillery Reserve: Colonel Calonge
 Three 12-pdr position batteries (18 guns)
 1st Bavarian Division: Lieutenant-General Crown Prince Ludwig of Bavaria
 Brigade: General-Major Rechberg
 1st Habermann Light battalion
 Leib Regiment (2 battalions)
 2nd Prince Royal Regiment (2 battalions)
 Brigade: General-Major Stengel
 4th Salern Regiment (2 battalions)
 8th Duc Pius Regiment (2 battalions)
 Cavalry Brigade: General-Major Zandt
 Minuzzi Dragoon Regiment (2 squadrons)
 Prince Royal Chevau-léger Regiment (4 squadrons)
 Artillery: Two 6-pdr foot batteries, 6-pdr horse battery (18 guns)
 2nd Bavarian Division: Lieutenant-General Karl Philipp von Wrede
 Brigade: General-Major Minuzzi
 6th Laroche Light battalion
 3rd Prince Karl Regiment (2 battalions)
 13th Regiment (2 battalions)
 Brigade: General-Major Beckers
 6th Duc Wilhelm Regiment (2 battalions)
 7th Löwenstein Regiment (2 battalions)
 Cavalry Brigade: General-Major Preysing
 König Chevau-léger Regiment (4 squadrons)
 Leiningen Chevau-léger Regiment (4 squadrons)
 Artillery: Two 6-pdr foot batteries, 6-pdr horse battery (18 guns)
 3rd Bavarian Division: Lieutenant-General Bernhard Erasmus von Deroy
 Brigade: General-Major Siebein
 5th Buttler Light battalion
 9th Isenburg Regiment (2 battalions)
 10th Juncker Regiment (2 battalions)
 Brigade: General-Major Vincenti
 7th Günter Light battalion
 5th Regiment (2 battalions)
 14th Preysing Regiment (2 battalions)
 Cavalry Brigade: General-Major Seydewitz
 Taxis Dragoon Regiment (4 squadrons)
 Bubenhoven Chevau-léger Regiment (4 squadrons)
 Artillery: Two 6-pdr foot batteries, 6-pdr horse battery (18 guns)

Württemberg (later VIII) Corps

General of Division Dominique Vandamme
 Reserve Artillery: Colonel Schnadow
 6-pdr foot battery (10 guns), two 6-pdr horse batteries (12 guns)
 Württemberg Infantry Division: Lieutenant General Neubronn
 Brigade: General-Major Friedrich von Franquemont
 Prince Royal Regiment (2 battalions)
 Duc Wilhelm Regiment (2 battalions)
 1st battalion Neubronn Fusilier Regiment
 Brigade: General-Major Scharfenstein
 Phull Regiment (2 battalions)
 Camrer Regiment (2 battalions)
 2nd battalion Neubronn Fusilier Regiment
 Light Brigade: General-Major Hügel
 König Jäger battalion
 1st Wolff Light battalion
 2nd Bruselle Light battalion
 Württemberg Cavalry Division: Lieutenant General Wöllwarth
 Brigade: General-Major Roeder
 König Chevau-léger Regiment (4 squadrons)
 Duc Henry Chevau-léger Regiment (4 squadrons)
 Brigade: General-Major Stettner
 König Chasseurs à cheval Regiment (4 squadrons)
 Duc Louis Chevau-léger Regiment (4 squadrons)

Generals

Footnotes

References

Bibliography
 Arnold, James. Crisis on the Danube: Napoleon’s Austrian Campaign of 1809. London: Arms and Armour, 1990. (New York: Paragon House, 1990) 
 Bowden, Scotty & Tarbox, Charlie. Armies on the Danube 1809. Arlington, Texas: Empire Games Press, 1980.
 Petre, F. Loraine. Napoleon and the Archduke Charles. New York: Hippocrene Books, (1909) 1976.
 Smith, Digby. The Napoleonic Wars Data Book. London: Greenhill, 1998.

External links
The following two websites are excellent sources for the full names of French and Austrian generals.
 French Wikipedia, Liste des généraux de la Révolution et du Premier Empire
 napoleon-series.org Austrian Generals: 1792–1815 by Digby Smith, compiled by Leopold Kudrna

Napoleonic Wars orders of battle
Battles of the War of the Fifth Coalition